S. Narayan (born 5 June 1962) is an Indian filmmaker, director, actor and lyricist of Kannada films. After Singeetam Srinivasa Rao, Narayan is the second director to direct Dr. Rajkumar and all his three sons. He has given many hits with Vishnuvardhan and also worked with many actors of Sandalwood. He has directed Tamil movie Jai.

Career
After assisting H. R. Bharghava, Raj Kishore and A. T. Raghu, Narayan made his directorial debut with the romantic drama Chaitrada Premanjali (1992), with newcomers, the film, which featured a successful soundtrack by Hamsalekha became a musical hit at the box office. He then went on to direct similar themed romantic films such as Meghamale (1994), Anuragada Alegalu (1992) and also successful family dramas like Thavarina Thottilu and Bevu Bella. Throughout the 2000s, he directed mostly remakes, such as Simhadriya Simha, Cheluvina Chittara and Suryavamsha. In 2015, he directed Daksha, starring Duniya Vijay, which was completely shot in single takes. In 2016, he was supposed to direct a project called JD, starring Jagadish Gowda and Dictator with Huccha Venkat; both got shelved after launch. He directed Na Panta Kano and Manasu Mallige, a remake of Marathi film Sairat.

Filmography

As director

As actor
This list is of films Narayan has acted to other directors.

As composer

References

External links
 

1962 births
Living people
Male actors from Bangalore
Male actors in Kannada cinema
Indian male film actors
Kannada film directors
Kannada film score composers
Kannada screenwriters
20th-century Indian male actors
21st-century Indian male actors
21st-century Indian composers
21st-century Indian dramatists and playwrights
Kannada Brahmins
21st-century Indian film directors
Film directors from Bangalore
Kannada-language lyricists
Screenwriters from Bangalore
Musicians from Bangalore
Recipients of the Rajyotsava Award 2006
21st-century Indian screenwriters